is a Japanese high school located in the Ōmori area of Ōta, Tokyo.

Tōkyū Ikegami Line's Ikegami Station is located near the school.

Club activities 
Ōmori High School is home to a number of clubs, but is most known for its dance club. The club uploads regularly on their YouTube channel 東京都立大森高校ダンス部. Clubs are divided into sports and culture clubs. For sports, there is a basketball club, volleyball club, table tennis club, baseball club, track and field club, swimming club, tennis club, soft tennis club, judo club, kendo club, badminton club, and soccer club. Culture clubs include a light music club (K-on), drama club, cooking club, ikebana club (flower arrangement), science club, astronomy club, brass band club, art club, and tea ceremony club.

See also

References

External links
 Ōmori High School (Japanese)
https://www.metro.ed.jp/omori-h/

Tokyo Metropolitan Government Board of Education schools
High schools in Tokyo
Ōta, Tokyo